Havdrup is a small railway town straddling the boundary between Solrød and Roskilde municipalities, some 30 km southwest of Copenhagen, Denmark. Havdrup station serves the Little South railway line between Roskilde and Køge. Havdrup had a population of 4,365 (1 January 2022). The original village, now known as Gammel Havdrup, is located about 3 km to the east of the modern railway town.

History
The name Havdrup is first documented in 1265 as Havertorp. The name is derived from the male name Havard and the suffix -torp.

Havdrup station was built in 1870 as part of the new Zealand South Line between Copenhagen and Næstved as well as the ferries to Falster at Masnedø. The location 3 km to the west of the village was selected so that the new station would also serve the Risbyholm estate.

Notable people
 Lars Emil Bruun (1852 in  Ulvemose Huse – 1923) a Danish merchant and numismatist
 Aage Rasmussen (1889 – 1983 in Havdrup) a Danish photographer and track and field athlete who competed in the 1912 Summer Olympics
 Nicolai Riise Madsen (born 1993 in Havdrup) a Danish footballer who plays for Rishøj Boldklub

References

Cities and towns in Region Zealand
Solrød Municipality